Ruffa and Ai is a Philippine morning talk and lifestyle show on ABS-CBN which was aired from February 16 to October 23, 2009. The show is hosted by Ruffa Gutierrez and Ai-Ai delas Alas.

History
The then-morning talk show Boy & Kris was at the brink of cancellation due to its rival competitor SiS (through the triumvate of sisters Gelli de Belen and Janice de Belen and Carmina Villaroel) consistently topping the ratings slate. In January 2009, rumors were spreading that the show will be moving to late-night but later February 3, 2009, Boy Abunda and Kris Aquino then confirmed this rumor, which led to airing their final episode on February 13 and they announced that their show will be replaced by a new morning talk show hosted by "Two Queens".

Another teaser following the show's cancellation aired hinting who would be the new hosts of the new morning talk show. It was revealed that Ruffa Gutierrez (Binibining Pilipinas-World 1993 and Miss World 1993 Second Princess) and Ai-Ai de las Alas (Philippines' Comedy Concert Queen) are named the hosts of the show under the title Ruffa & Ai and premiered on February 16, 2009. In turn, Boy & Kris were moved to late-night and hosted the new showbiz-oriented news show SNN: Showbiz News Ngayon.

In the first episode of the show, Abunda introduced the 2 of them in their new stints and featured KC Concepcion, Sarah Geronimo and Gabby Concepcion as its first guests. The show proved to be an instant success and topped the ratings game. It airs before Pilipinas, Game Ka Na Ba?, which is hosted by Edu Manzano.

In August 2009, the show was turned into a pre-pageant primer due to the airing of the Miss Universe 2009 pageant on the network, which featured Binibining Pilipinas-Universe 1994 and Miss Universe 1994 Top 6 finalist Charlene Gonzales as guest host substituting de las Alas. One of the notable segments of the show is the revival of Star Circle Quest: Search for the Kiddie Idol, which is on its third season. It named Bugoy Cariño as the Grand Kiddie Questor, with Izzy Canillo as the first runner-up and child stars Eros Espiritu, Xyriel Manabat and Fatty Mendoza in the Top 5. Current Gimme 5 member Brace Arquiza also joined in this contest.

On October 23, 2009, the show aired its final episode, together with Pilipinas, Game Ka Na Ba?, due to its low ratings against its competitor. It was then replaced by Three Dads with One Mommy and Showtime on its timeslot. The show was the last morning talk show aired by ABS-CBN until the premiere of Simply KC.

Hosts
Main hosts
Ruffa Gutierrez
Ai-Ai delas Alas

Guest host
Charlene Gonzales (1 episode replacing Ai-Ai delas Alas)

See also
List of shows previously aired by ABS-CBN

References

External links
Official website
Ruffa and Ai at Telebisyon.net

ABS-CBN original programming
2009 Philippine television series debuts
2009 Philippine television series endings
Philippine television talk shows
Filipino-language television shows